The Ayr Scottish Eagles were a professional Scottish ice hockey club, from Ayr, Scotland. They were formed in 1996 and played their home games at the Centrum Arena. The team competed in the Ice Hockey Superleague and the club's main (title) sponsor was Barr Construction. The club folded during the 2002–03 season after a move to Braehead Arena.

History 
The Ayr Scottish Eagles were founded in 1996 and played in the Ice Hockey Superleague. The team quickly rose to become one of the top teams in the United Kingdom, due in part to achieving the grand slam in their second season (1997–98) winning all four major UK ice hockey trophies, these were the British Championship, Superleague, the Autumn Cup and Express Cup, the first team ever to do so during the existence of the Ice Hockey Superleague. Also in 1998 they achieved great success (for a British team), when they twice defeated Ak Bars Kazan in the European Hockey League.

2002–03
In August 2002, it was announced by owner Bill Barr that the team were to permanently relocate to the Braehead Arena in Renfrewshire, outside Glasgow.

Bob Zeller, Belfast Giants' founder was announced as managing director and the team changed their name to Scottish Eagles, dropping Ayr from their name. Bob Zeller remained a shareholder in the Belfast Giants. The reason given for the relocation was due to the Braehead Arena having a larger seating capacity and a larger catchment area, expected to increase the fanbase of the club.

The club (with the new name) folded on 14 November 2002, after just six home games, in what was to become the final season of the Ice Hockey Superleague. They were the second team in the league to fold that season; the first being Manchester Storm.

Post demise
Friends of Eagles Hockey, organised an exhibition match at the Centrum Arena on 4 February 2003 as a fund raising event to raise funds for players and officials who had been left in financial difficulty due to the bankruptcy of Ice hockey Services Ltd, the Eagles operating company. The Eagles side was an all-star team that played against a UK select all-star team. The match officials were referee Moray Hanson and linesmen Alan Craig and Rab Cowan.

Friends of Eagles Hockey, campaigned for the return of ice hockey to the Centrum Arena after the Eagles's demise. Ice rink operators Planet Ice showed an interest in running the Centrum as an ice arena; however the arena was demolished in 2009 and the site is now home to a new supermarket.

Braehead Clan
The Braehead Clan ice hockey club are now based at the Braehead Arena and play in the Elite Ice Hockey League. In their first season, there was an effort to recruit former Ayr Scottish Eagles fans to the Clan support. Ayr Scottish Eagles fans who held a season ticket at Braehead in the 2002–03 season that was cut short due to the team folding were offered a season ticket in Braehead's first season.

Although the Scottish Eagles and Braehead Clan were both based at the Braehead Arena, this is where the commonalities between the two ice hockey clubs end. The Scottish Eagles were operated by Ice Hockey Services Ltd  which underwent a Voluntary Members Liquidation and was wound up on 23 June 2005. Braehead Clan is operated by Clan Entertainment Ltd  that was Incorporated on 3 February 2010.

Home arenas
The original home of the Eagles was the Centrum Arena. It was officially opened on 25 August 1996 and was run by Barr Leisure Limited, a subsidiary of Barr Holdings Ltd. The Eagles played their first home game there on 1 September 1996.

After an announcement by Bill Barr, the Eagles moved to the Braehead Arena for the 2002–03 season, where they played just six home games before folding. The Centrum was still used as a training venue throughout this period.

Rosters

Club record

Season-by-season record

Player records

Franchise scoring leaders 

These are the top-ten point-scorers, scoring leaders and assists in franchise history.

Note: Pos = Position; GP = Games played; G = Goals; A = Assists; Pts = Points; P/G = Points per game

Team captains 
 Angelo Catenaro, 1996–99
 Shawn Byram, 1999–2001
 Alan Schuler, 2001–02
 Sean Selmser, 2002–03

NHL alumni 
Many of Ayr's players were NHL draft picks and played in the NHL before signing for the Ayr Eagles.

Edmonton Oilers
 Joaquin Gage (94–96 & 00–01) 
 Ian Herbers (93–94) 
 Jason Bowen (92–97)

Pittsburgh Penguins
 Philippe DeRouville (95–97) 
 Rob Dopson (93–94)

St. Louis Blues
 Geoff Sarjeant (94–95)
 Vincent Riendeau (88–92)

San Jose Sharks
 Geoff Sarjeant (95–96) 
 Ed Courtenay (91–93) 
 Dody Wood (92–93, 94–98)

Vancouver Canucks
 Frank Caprice (82-88)

Montreal Canadiens
 Vincent Riendeau (87-88)

Detroit Red Wings
 Vincent Riendeau (92–94)Boston Bruins
 Vincent Riendeau (94–95) 
 Shayne Stevenson (90–92)

Tampa Bay Lightning
 Ian Herbers (99–00) 
 Shayne Stevenson (92–93)

New York Islanders
 Ian Herbers (99–00) 
 Shawn Byram (90–91)

Philadelphia Flyers
 Jason Bowen (92–97) 
 Phil Crowe (95–96)

Chicago Blackhawks
 Shawn Byram (91–92)

Los Angeles Kings
 Phil Crowe (93–94)

Ottawa Senators
 Phil Crowe (96–99)

International capped players
Several players were also selected to play for their national team in the Ice Hockey World Championships.

 Canada
 Mark Cavallin (95–96) 
 Joaquin Gage (99–00) 
 Rob Dopson (98–99) 
 Evan Marble (97–98) 
 Dan Rutushny (88–92) 
 Vince Boe (92–93) 
 Trevor Burgess (94–95) 
 Xavier Majic (96–97 & 99–00) 
 Sean Selmer (96–98) 
 Rhett Gordon (99–00) 
 Cam Bristow (98–99) 
 Yves Heroux (89–90) 
 Jamie Steer (95–96) 
 Eric Murano (89–90) 
 David St Pierre (94–95) 
 Corey Lyons (92–93) 
 Darren Colbourne (89–90) Belarus
 Yuri Krivokhiza (98–00)

 Czechoslovakia
 Frantisek Prochazka  (85–92 & 93–94 Czech Rep.) 
 Jiri Lala (80-88)

 Austria
 Sean Selmer (05–06)

 Italy
 John Parco (02–10) 
 Mark Cupolo (92–93)

 West Germany
 Markus Berwanger (84-89 & 90–91 Germany)

Honours and awards 
British Championship
 1997–98 Winners

Superleague Winners
 1997–98 Winners
 2001–02 Runners-up

Benson and Hedges Cup
 1996–97 Runners-up
 1997–98 Winners
 1998–99 Runners-up

Express Cup
 1997–98 Winners
 2000–01 Runners-up
 2001–02 Winners

Coach of the Year Trophy
 Jim Lynch - 1996–97
 Jim Lynch - 1997–98

Player of the Year Trophy
 Rob Dopson - 1997–98

Sekonda Face to Watch
 Tony Hand - December 1999–2000
 Tony Hand - November 2000–01Ice Hockey Annual Trophy
 Tony Hand - 1999–2000
 Tony Hand - 2000–01
 Jonathan Weaver - 2001–02

All Star First Team
 Rob Dopson - 1997–98
 Scott Young - 1997–98
 Mark Montanari - 1997–98
 Geoff Sarjeant - 1999–2000
 Tony Hand - 2000–01
 Johan Silfwerplatz - 2001–02

All Star Second Team
 Sam Groleau - 1997–98
 Joaquin Gage - 2001–02
 Alan Schuler - 2001–02
 Ed Courtenay - 2001–02

British Ice Hockey Hall of Fame
 Jim Lynch - inducted in 2001

Player of the Year Award
 Vince Boe  - 1999–2000

Jerseys

Notes 

Ice hockey teams in Scotland
Sport in Ayr
Ice hockey clubs established in 1996
Sports clubs disestablished in 2002